Apochima is a genus of moths in the family Geometridae.

Species
 Apochima diaphanaria (Püngeler, 1904)
 Apochima flabellaria (Heeger, 1838)
 Apochima juglansiaria (Graeser, 1888)
 Apochima rjabovi (Wehrli, 1936)

References
 Apochima at Markku Savela's Lepidoptera and Some Other Life Forms

Ennominae
Geometridae genera